Nagarzê County is a county of Shannan located in the south-east of the Tibet Autonomous Region. The Yarlung Tsangpo river dominates the county. Baidi Township is located in the county.

Settlements
Baidi
Kaba
Karreg
Langkazi
Lingqu
Nagarzê (capital)
Zuidui

Climate

References

 
Counties of Tibet
Shannan, Tibet